In the 1894–95 season, the English football team Everton F.C. finished second in the 1894–95 Football League. It was the team's best result since winning the League in 1891. Everton reached the quarterfinals of the F.A. Challenge Cup where they lost to Sheffield Wednesday F.C.

Regular Football League First team

 

Number of games in which this eleven lined up = 0

Other members of the first team squad

Bob Howarth was the biggest name to leave Goodison Park during the summer as he returned to Preston North End. This gave Charlie Parry the chance to win back the left back shirt that he had lost when Howarth had arrived two years earlier. Reserve goalkeepers, John Whitehead and David Jardine both moved on, to Liverpool and Nelson respectively to seemingly cement Richard Williams' place between the posts. Two other fringe players, defender, Billy Lindsay and half back, Jack Walker left in search of regular first team football at Grimsby and Ardwick respectively. The only major inclusion to the first team squad was the signing of Tom McInnes from Scottish side Third Lanark. He instantly slotted into the inside right birth while Jack Bell moved out to outside left with Alf Milward making way.

Everton got off to a flying start when winning all their opening eight games and talk of the title coming to Goodison Park was high by the time of the ninth game at Blackburn. It was here that Jack Southworth suffered a leg injury that ended his career and without him Everton's air of invincibility slipped. Blackburn came from behind to beat the ten men and Everton then suffered a string of draws before returning to winning ways. Fred Geary took over at centre forward but yet again found himself losing the berth as Abe Hartley proved more potent in front of goal. Despite having seen off two rivals, Richard Williams' place in goal remained one that the selectors aimed to rectify. Reserves William Sutton and Tom Cain each got their chance but both were considered unworthy, which saw the board spend £150 to bring 'Happy' Jack Hillman from Burnley with Williams leaving to join Luton. Hillman was established as the regular keeper by the end of the season.

Despite the loss of Southworth, Everton maintained a strong title challenge and topped the table throughout the remainder of 1894 before dropping to third after a defeat by Wednesday on New Year's Day 1895. Everton never regained top spot and their failure to win the title was put down to their failing to win any of their final three games when victories would have seen them crowned champions. The first of the trio of games was a shock 2–3 reverse against Derby when a draw would have been enough to take them top. It was the penultimate game that proved crucial however.

The destiny of the title was still in Everton's hands going into the final two games but their opponents in the first of those two games were title rivals Sunderland at Newcastle Road in what was effectively a title decider. This was Sunderland's final game and they needed only to draw to clinch the title for themselves. Twenty thousand people saw Sunderland win the match and the championship with a 2–1 scoreline and rendered Everton's final game meaningless. As it was, Everton could only draw that game at Aston Villa 2–2, a result which would have taken the title to Sunderland regardless.

Everton's best season since being crowned champions in 1891 was viewed on Merseyside as a huge disappointment as everyone connected with the club felt that the title had been theirs to win and instead had been gift wrapped for a Sunderland side who, while deserving champions, seemed flattered by their five-point margin of victory. In addition Sunderland had taken three of the four points on offer from their encounters with Everton that season, making claims by Evertonians that the better side had finished second ring a little hollow.

The Football League

First Division final table

Football Association Challenge Cup

Club League records set this season
 Most points in a season {42}
 Most home points in a season {26}
 Most away points in a season {16}
 Most victories in a season {18}
 Most victories at home in a season {12}
 Most drawn games in a season {6}
 Most games drawn away from home in a season {4}
 Equalled fewest home defeats in a season {1}
 Most goal scored away from home in a season {35}
 Alex Latta scored a club record sixth league hat-trick this season
 Equalled longest winning sequence in a season {8}
 Longest home winning sequence in a season {7}
 Equalled longest unbeaten sequence in a season {8}
 Longest unbeaten home sequence in a season {14}
 Longest sequence of drawn games in a season {3}
 Longest sequence of away drawn games {2}

Negative club records
 Equalled longest away sequence without a win {4}

References

 www.Evertonfc.com
 www.allfootballers.com
 www.soccerbase.com

1894-95
English football clubs 1894–95 season